The 1978–79 season was Port Vale's 67th season of football in the Football League, and their first season (seventh overall) back in the Fourth Division following their relegation from the Third Division. Bernie Wright was highly impressive with his fifteen goals, though the rest of the team limped to a sixteenth-place finish, and exited both cup competitions at the first stage. This occurred with unrest in the boardroom behind the scenes, unrest amongst fans on the terraces, and annoyance from Butler towards the fans for their abuse of his players. Butler broke club transfer-records in both signing players and selling them.

Overview

Fourth Division
The pre-season saw new manager Dennis Butler sign big striker Bernie Wright from Bradford City for £9,000 and right-back Neil Wilkinson on a free transfer from Blackburn Rovers. Butler also took the team on a three match tour of Scotland. Just before the start of the season Ken Todd was signed for a club-record £37,000, despite Todd having only made a handful of appearances for Wolverhampton Wanderers. In the summer former Valiant Tommy McLaren committed suicide, friend and teammate Ray Williams said 'leaving the club shattered him'. On 2 October a Memorial Fund match was played, raising £3,000.

The season opened with just two victories in eleven league games, as both Todd and keeper John Connaughton were sidelined with injuries. The two wins came away from home, 5–1 over rivals Crewe Alexandra at Gresty Road (Wright scoring a hat-trick) and 3–1 at Doncaster Rovers at the Keepmoat Stadium. Butler then threw himself into the transfer market, selling John Froggatt to Northampton Town for £8,000, and then Mick Moore and Terry Bailey to Wigan Athletic and Northwich Victoria respectively, both for £2,000. Another 'shrewd piece of business' came when star forward Ken Beamish was sold to Bury for £35,000, whilst Gerry Keenan moved the other way for £15,000. In October, Felix Healy was signed from Finn Harps for £8,000, and Neil Wilkinson and £3,000 were traded to Crewe in exchange for outside-right Kevin Tully. Winning five games in a sequence of eight, Todd was still a disappointment to fans, who began getting 'on his back'. Butler's signings did not stop however, and instead he sold John Ridley to Leicester City for a club-record £55,000. He then signed Andy Proudlove from Buxton for £1,000 – despite interest from Stafford Rangers. Then in came midfielder Peter Farrell from Bury for a new club-record £40,000. They ended their club-record streaks of 42 away games without keeping a clean sheet on 30 September, and of twelve home games without a win on 21 October.

Going into December four games unbeaten, Butler then splashed out £30,000 on Chester's Bob Delgado. Despite this, Vale were thumped 6–2 by Barnsley in front of 10,532 at Oakwell. In January, legendary England goalkeeper Gordon Banks was appointed as coach, and results began to pick up as Vale were lifted into eighth spot. Healy left the club in February, only to return two weeks later. Behind the scenes there was trouble when Arthur McPherson ruled that club shares could only be transferable to a male relation, in order 'to safeguard plans by the current directors'. More defeats came, and the big money signings were targeted by fans for abuse. Butler reacted by calling the fans 'a bunch of yobs'. From mid-March, Vale went seven games with only one victory and one goal scored. On 21 March violence returned to Vale Park, when Portsmouth keeper Peter Mellor saved a penalty, floored Peter Farrell and made an 'assortment of gestures' to the Bycars End – he found himself attacked by a Vale fan on the pitch for his efforts. On 13 April, Vale surrendered a three-goal lead at Springfield Park to lose 5–3 to Wigan Athletic. Danger of ending up in the re-election zone was ended with a late four game unbeaten spell, despite heavy defeats from Reading and York City.

They finished in sixteenth place with 42 points, with an awful defensive record of seventy goals conceded. Despite this their scoring tally away from Burslem was the highest in the Football League, and they were given £2,125 as a reward. Player of the Year Bernie Wright secured fifteen goals in what was a poor season for the club.

Finances
On the financial side, a record £52,000 loss was made despite a remarkable £225,000 income from the club's commercial department. Butler's transfer dealings had lost the club £36,000, whilst wages more than doubled from £113,000 to £259,000. The club's liabilities stood at £187,000. Despite all of this the club made 'surprisingly sparing use of the pruning knife', letting go just four players, most significantly David Harris (Halifax Town) and Andy Proudlove (Stafford Rangers). Behind the scenes, long-time club servant and president Mark Singer was fired, though chairman Arthur McPherson made no comment to the press.

Cup competitions
In the FA Cup, a weeks preparation in Blackpool failed to prevent Vale exiting at the first stage with a 1–0 defeat to Bradford City at Valley Parade.

In the League Cup, Third Division Chester knocked the Vale out 4–1 on aggregate.

League table

Results
Port Vale's score comes first

Football League Fourth Division

Results by matchday

Matches

FA Cup

League Cup

Player statistics

Appearances

Top scorers

Transfers

Transfers in

Transfers out

Loans out

References
Specific

General

Port Vale F.C. seasons
Port Vale